Trechus lailensis is a species of ground beetle in the subfamily Trechinae. It was described by Belousov in 1989.

The Trechus Lailensis is one of the 800 different types of a genus of the ground beadle called Trechus. They can be found mostly near the Palearctic and the Near East, including Europe.

References

lailensis
Beetles described in 1989